Dylan John Smith (born 21 June 2006) is a Scottish professional footballer who plays as a defender for Ross County.

Career

Ross County
Dylan Smith signed a two-year apprenticeship with Ross County on 23 June 2022 after impressing with the clubs under-18 team. Smith made his debut for County in the Scottish Premiership against Rangers coming on in the 84th minute for Kazeem Olaigbe.

Career statistics

References

2006 births
Living people
Association football defenders
Scottish footballers
Ross County F.C. players
Scottish Professional Football League players
Footballers from Inverness